Rajagopalan Parthasarathy is an Indian mathematician who specialised in representation theory of Lie groups and algebras.

He was awarded in 1985 the Shanti Swarup Bhatnagar Prize for Science and Technology, the highest science award in India,  in the mathematical sciences category.

Prof. Parthasarathy is an expert in representation theory of semisimple Lie groups. His initial work was on  the realization of the so-called discrete series of representations of a semisimple Lie group in the space of Dirac Spinors. He made considerable progress in many central problems in representation theory. His work on the resolution of the Blattner's conjecture and the question of unitarisability of certain highest weight modules are  significant contributions to this area in mathematics.

References

External links
Indian National Science Academy database

1945 births
Living people
20th-century Indian mathematicians
Recipients of the Shanti Swarup Bhatnagar Award in Mathematical Science